Isengard and Northern Gondor is a 1983 fantasy role-playing game supplement published by Iron Crown Enterprises for Middle-earth Role Playing.

Contents
Isengard and Northern Gondor is a campaign module that details the plains of Calenardhon (which later became Rohan) in Northern Gondor, and Saruman's tower of Orthanc at Isengard.

Reception
William A. Barton reviewed Isengard and Northern Gondor in The Space Gamer No. 73.

References

Middle-earth Role Playing supplements
Role-playing game supplements introduced in 1983